Transport is the second studio album by Borderland, a duo consisting of Juan Atkins and Moritz von Oswald. It was released via Tresor on April 29, 2016, as part of Tresor's 25th anniversary celebrations. It is the follow-up to the duo's 2013 debut studio album, Borderland. "Riod" was released as a single from the album.

Critical reception

Paul Simpson of AllMusic gave the album 4 out of 5 stars, writing, "Transports seven tracks are hypnotic, expansive, and unforced, with both artists seeming very comfortable in the studio." Maria Perevedentseva of The Quietus wrote, "Transport does not represent a paradigm shift nor an experimental frenzy, but what it does offer is a studied and disarmingly beautiful crystallisation of more than two decades of techno, produced by two people who have been at its cutting edge since the very beginning."

Rolling Stone placed it at number 19 on the "20 Best EDM and Electronic Albums of 2016" list.

Track listing

Personnel
Credits adapted from liner notes.

 Juan Atkins – production
 Moritz von Oswald – production
 Laurens von Oswald – additional production
 CGB – mastering
 Chazme – artwork
 Vanja Golubovic – graphic design

Charts

References

External links
 

2016 albums